Born Reckless is a 1958 American Western film starring Mamie Van Doren and released through Warner Bros. studios.

Plot
Kelly Cobb travels and performs in various country rodeos in order to get enough money to buy a patch of land to call his own. One day he picks up Jackie Adams, a saloon singer and trick rider whom he saves from a clutching admirer. The two travel together and Jackie begins to fall in love with Kelly. Kelly however doesn't notice because of his drive to risk his life for the dream of the land he pursues. Jackie sums up that Kelly was just born reckless and she strives to change his free roaming lifestyle.

Cast
Mamie Van Doren as Jackie Adams
Jeff Richards as Kelly Cobb
Arthur Hunnicutt as Cool Man
Carol Ohmart as Liz
Tom Duggan as Mark Wilson
Nacho Galindo as Papa Gomez
Allegra Varron as Mama Gomez
Jim Canino as Jose
Jeanne Carmen as Rodeo Girl

Production
Jeff Richards was cast shortly after his release from Metro-Goldwyn-Mayer. He did a lot of his own stunts, and had to take a brief hiatus after an automobile accident he sustained while driving to rehearsals. Carol Ohmart was offered the part as an apology by Jack Warner for accusing her of hiding her then-husband Wayde Preston, who had walked off the set of Colt .45.

External links

References

1958 films
Warner Bros. films
1958 Western (genre) films
Films directed by Howard W. Koch
American Western (genre) films
Rodeo in film
1958 drama films
1950s English-language films
1950s American films